Maria-Jose Cooper (née van Hattum) (born 16 July 1960) is a former association football player who represented New Zealand at international level.

Cooper made a single appearance for the Football Ferns in a 1–0 win over Australia on 8 October 1979.

Cooper is the sister of former All Whites goalkeeper Frank van Hattum and fellow women's international Grazia MacIntosh.

References

1960 births
Living people
New Zealand women's international footballers
New Zealand women's association footballers
New Zealand people of Dutch descent
Sportspeople from New Plymouth
Women's association football midfielders